Dorcadion jacobsoni is a species of beetle in the family Cerambycidae. It was described by Jakovlev in 1899. It is known from China and Kazakhstan.

Varietas
 Dorcadion jacobsoni var. apicipenne Jakovlev, 1900
 Dorcadion jacobsoni var. sokolovi Jakovlev, 1900

References

jacobsoni
Beetles described in 1899